Mehr Abdul Haq (Urdu:; , Layyah, British India –  Multan, Pakistan) was a philologist from Pakistan.

After completing his education he joined education department where he worked on different posts. He retired in 1970. He got his PhD degree from University of the Punjab, Lahore, Pakistan in “Multani Zaban ka Urdu se taaluq”. He was a Saraiki linguist, research scholar, critic and a historian. He was also an expert on Khwaja Ghulam Farid (Faridiat).

He was awarded the Pride of Performance award by the President of Pakistan in 1994.

Works
Translation of Quran in Saraiki
Multani Zaban ka Urdu se taaluq (Connecting relations between Urdu and Multani (Saraiki) language), Published in 1967
Mazeed lisani tahqiqan (More linguistic research)
Lughat-I-Faridi (Dictionary of Khawaja Ghulam Farid) (A Saraiki folk poet)
Vision of Khawaja Farid-Past and present
Saraiki lok Geet (Saraiki folk songs)
Lalarian (Poetry in Saraiki language)
Hindu Sanmiat (Hindu mythology)
Multan ke badshah, namwar governor aur hamla aawar (Kings, governors and invaders of Multan)
Saraiki Zaban aur us ki hamsaya ilaqi zabaneen
Saraiki zaban de qaeday, qanoon (Rules and regulations of Saraiki language)

References

1915 births
1995 deaths
20th-century Pakistani historians
People from Layyah District
University of the Punjab alumni
Pakistani educational theorists
Pakistani lexicographers
Pakistani literary critics
Saraiki-language writers
Linguists from Pakistan
People from Multan
Recipients of the Pride of Performance
20th-century linguists
Pakistani philologists
20th-century philologists
20th-century lexicographers